The 2011–12 Texas A&M Aggies men's basketball team represented Texas A&M University in the 2011–12 NCAA Division I men's basketball season. Billy Kennedy was in his first season as head coach after the position was vacated by Mark Turgeon in May 2011. The team played its home games in Reed Arena as members of the reformed ten member Big 12 Conference for the final season as they departed for the Southeastern Conference in 2012–13.

Previous season

The Aggies finished the previous year with a 24–9 record, 12–6 in Big 12 play, a semi-finals appearance in the Big 12 tournament, and a first-round appearance in the NCAA tournament.

Preseason

Player departures 
The Aggies will be without starting guard B.J. Holmes and starting forward Nathan Walkup. Other losses include guards Derrek Lewis and Andrew Darko, as well as forward Marshall Carrell.

Recruiting 

|-
| colspan="7" style="padding-left:10px;" | Overall Recruiting Rankings:
|}

Roster

Schedule 

|-
!colspan=9| Summer European Tour

      
|-
!colspan=9| Exhibition

|-
!colspan=9| Regular season

|-
!colspan=9| 2012 Big 12 men's basketball tournament

References 

Texas A&M Aggies men's basketball seasons
Texas AandM